Rajiv Gurung, known by his criminal alias Deepak Manange, is a Nepali gangster and politician, who was elected to Gandaki Provincial Assembly in the 2017 elections from Manang (B) constituency as an independent candidate. He became the minister of sports in the provincial government in April 2021.

Gurung started out as an extortionist in the tourist district of Thamel in the early 1990s. He made an arch-enemy out of fellow gangster Chakre Milan when he led a gang attack against Milan in 2004. He was convicted of assault in 2008 for a separate incident and sentenced to one year. In 2013, he was convicted of attempted murder for the 2004 incident and sentenced to five years. He had yet to complete his sentence when he ran for office in 2017, and was therefore legally ineligible to stand in the election. He was on the run in early 2018 but was arrested by April. The Supreme Court released him on bail in December and he took his oath of office in January 2019. He was arrested again in January 2020 after assaulting a fellow attendee of a public function.

Early life and career
Born in Thamel, Kathmandu, Manange was raised in Kolkata and Sikkim of India. He completed his high school in Sikkim. He returned to Kathmandu around 1994 and ran a ready-made garments business for two years, selling Nepali garment in Delhi and bringing back leather jackets to sell in Nepal. He then moved to Moreh, India; he returned three years later. In Kathmandu, he started a nightclub called Yak Horn Bar. According to Manange, he came to be noticed by authorities after he beat up the then Crown Prince Dipendra's aide-de-camp, and was eventually forced to close the club. He went on to start multiple businesses in the capital, mainly discos, clubs and restaurants. He later started a construction business.

Crime
A self-proclaimed don, Manange's involvement with crime in Kathmandu goes back to the early 1990s, when he started a protection racket in the tourist district of Thamel in Kathmandu, to extort hotel and restaurant owners. His first arrest was in 2059 BS (2002-03 CE). He has been arrested at least a dozen times since.

2004 attack on Chakre Milan
Manange led a 15-man attack against another Kathmandu gangster Chakre Milan in May 2004. Milan's left hand was nearly severed in the attack that involved swords. The incident left Milan physically weak, and made the two, arch-rivals. Manange was arrested on 31 March 2005 charged with attempted murder; he was released from prison on 5 February 2007.

2008 assault
Manange was found guilty of assault in a separate incident and sentenced to a year in prison in 2008. After serving a month, he managed to get himself released by successfully petitioning that he was Rajiv Gurung, not Deepak Manange (the named accused). Two months after release, he was rearrested on  22 February 2009, and made to serve the remaining eleven months, following a review. He was again arrested immediately after release on 20 January 2009, for manhandling a policeman. He was released a month later under bail of Rs 25,000.

Politics
Manange sought political protection and found favour with Pashupati Shamsher JBR of Rastriya Prajatantra Party (RPP). He then joined Laxman Tharu's Federalist Socialist Party in 2011-12 (2068 BS). He joined RPP in early 2017. In the 2017 local elections, RPP and Communist Party of Nepal (Unified Marxist-Leninist) (CPN UML) fielded joint candidates for Kathmandu city. Manange was arrested for fear that he might interfere in the election on behalf of RPP's deputy mayoral candidate; he was kept in the same cell with his arch-rival Chakre Milan who was also arrested to prevent disruption during the election. He defected from RPP, which he was the Manang district chairman of, along with the entire district committee, and joined CPN UML before the provincial elections of 2017.

Provincial Assembly member
The CPN UML district committee for Manang unanimously recommended Manange as the party candidate for Manang (B) constituency in the 2017 provincial assembly elections for the Gandaki Province. However, following public outcry, the party leadership nominated one of the other RPP defectors instead. The party's official candidate withdrew later, and the Left Alliance supported Manange, who had filed his candidacy as an independent. He won the seat with 1,410 votes, defeating his nearest rival, Karma Gurung of Nepali Congress, who received 1020 votes.

Manange was on the run in early 2018. He was arrested in April 2018, and was sworn-in in January 2019 after the Supreme Court released him on bail in December 2018. He joined the Nepal Communist Party shortly after.

Manange was again arrested on 23 January 2020 after the Kaski District Chairperson of All Nepal Football Association filed a First Information Report (FIR) against him alleging that he had verbally  abused and beaten him during a public event two days earlier.

Minister
He was appointed sports minister for the provincial government on 29 April 2021, in an effort by the ruling CPN UML to secure support for chief minister Prithvi Subba Gurung's government, amid political turmoil in the aftermath of the 2020–21 dissolution and reinstatement of the Parliament of Nepal.

Notes

References

People from Manang District, Nepal
21st-century Nepalese politicians
Year of birth missing (living people)
Place of birth missing (living people)
Members of the Provincial Assembly of Gandaki Province
Nepal
Communist Party of Nepal (Unified Marxist–Leninist) politicians
Nepal Communist Party (NCP) politicians
Rastriya Prajatantra Party politicians
Living people
Gurung people
Provincial cabinet ministers of Nepal